Ana María Ruiz Polvorosa (born 14 December 1987) credited as Ana Polvorosa, Ana María Ruiz or Ana Mª Ruiz is a Spanish film, theatre and television actress.

Early life
She was born Ana María Ruiz Polvorosa in Madrid, Spain on 14 December 1987.

Career
She has appeared in various film, theatre and television productions.

Filmography

Theatre work

Television work

Guest appearances

Notes

External links 

1987 births
Living people
Actresses from Madrid
Spanish film actresses
Spanish stage actresses
Spanish television actresses
21st-century Spanish actresses